Arthur Noel Ellis (9 July 1921 – 6 July 1942) was an Australian rules footballer who played with Melbourne in the Victorian Football League.

Family
The son of Cornelius Stanley Ellis (1894–1948), and Amy Gertrude Ellis (1894–1982), née Christensen, Arthur Noel Ellis was born on 9 July 1921. He had two brothers: Paul, and Graeme.

Education
He attended Wesley College, in St Kilda Road.

Football
He played for Wesley College's First XVIII; and, at the same time was playing for Collegians Football Club.

In 1940, "Noel Ellis was outstanding at centre half-back with Collegians, in the Victorian Amateur Football Association, [who] transferred to the Demons when the amateurs suspended their competition half way through the season [due to the war]" (Sporting Globe, 24 August 1940).

His application for a permit to play with South Melbourne was refused by the VFL Permit Committee, on 26 June 1940 — on the precedent-setting grounds that, as a boarder at Wesley College, Wesley College (rather than his parents' residence at Red Cliffs, Victoria) was deemed to be his official place of residence — and, so, given the physical location of Wesley College (on the eastern side of St Kilda Road), Ellis was residentially bound to Melbourne. The VFL Permit Committee granted him a clearance from Old Collegians to Melbourne.

He participated in his first practice at Melbourne the following evening. He was selected as 19th man in his first First XVIII match for Melbourne, against Hawthorn, on 24 August 1940 (round 17). He also played for the First XVIII in the first two matches of the 1941 season (against Fitzroy, and South Melbourne).

He was injured when playing for the Melbourne First XVIII against Carlton in the first round of the Patriotic Premiership (1941), at the M.C.G., on Saturday, 24 May 1940, and did not play ever again.

Cricket
He played cricket at Wesley College; and, also, for the South Melbourne Cricket Club.

Military service
He enlisted in the Second AIF in October 1941 – V185010.

Death
Only 20 years of age (three days before he turned 21), Ellis was accidentally shot and killed, by a mishandled revolver, at a World War II military camp in Queensland.

The soldier who fired the weapon, Lieutenant Mervyn David Henry (VX101968), had been talking to Ellis in the mess tent when the incident occurred.

The Melbourne First XVIII wore black armbands in their match against Carlton, on 11 July 1942, as a mark of respect for the memory of Ellis.

See also
 List of Victorian Football League players who died in active service

References

External links

 World War II Nominal Roll: Ellis, Arthur Noel (V185010).
 Roll of Honour: Acting Sergeant Arthur Noel Ellis (V185010), Australian War Memorial.
 DemonWiki profile
 Boyles Football Photos: Noel Ellis.

1921 births
1942 deaths
Australian rules footballers from Victoria (Australia)
Melbourne Football Club players
Collegians Football Club players
People educated at Wesley College (Victoria)
Australian military personnel killed in World War II
Firearm accident victims
Deaths by firearm in Queensland
Accidental deaths in Queensland
Australian Army personnel of World War II
Australian Army soldiers